Eigen is a high-level  C++ library of template headers for linear algebra, matrix and vector operations, geometrical transformations, numerical solvers and related  algorithms.
Eigen is open-source software licensed under the Mozilla Public License 2.0 since version 3.1.1. Earlier versions were licensed under the GNU Lesser General Public License. Version 1.0 was released in Dec 2006.

Eigen is implemented using the expression templates metaprogramming technique, meaning it builds expression trees at compile time and generates custom code to evaluate these. Using expression templates and a cost model of floating point operations, the library performs its own loop unrolling and vectorization. Eigen itself can provide BLAS and a subset of LAPACK interfaces.

Release 3.4 (2021) includes many improvements.

See also
 List of numerical libraries
 Numerical linear algebra

References

C++ libraries
C++ numerical libraries
Free computer libraries
Free software programmed in C++
Numerical analysis software for Linux
Software using the Mozilla license